The Fryingpan River is a tributary of the Roaring Fork River, approximately  long, in Eagle and Pitkin counties in Colorado, United States.

History
The reason for the unusual name of the river is that when a group of trappers were attacked by a band of Ute Native Americans, only two men survived, one of whom was injured. Leaving his wounded friend in a cave close by, the last man left to summon help, but not before hanging a frying pan in a tree so that he could find the cave again on his return.

Geography
It rises in northeastern Pitkin County, in the White River National Forest in the Sawatch Mountains along the western side of the continental divide. It flows westward along the county line between Pitkin and Eagle County. Below Meredith, it is dammed to form the Ruedi Reservoir. It joins the Roaring Fork below Basalt. A portion of the river's water is diverted to the east side of the continental divide for irrigation and drinking water via the Fryingpan-Arkansas Project.

See also

 List of rivers of Colorado
 List of tributaries of the Colorado River

References

External links

Rivers of Eagle County, Colorado
Rivers of Pitkin County, Colorado
Rivers of Colorado
Roaring Fork Valley
Tributaries of the Colorado River in Colorado